Henry Smith may refer to:

Politics and government

United States
Henry Smith (Rhode Island governor) (1766–1818), Governor of Rhode Island
Henry Smith (Texas governor) (1788–1851), Governor of Texas
Henry G. Smith (1807–1878), Justice of the Tennessee Supreme Court
Henry K. Smith (1811–1854), mayor of Buffalo, New York
Henry Smith (speaker) (1829–1884), Speaker of the New York State Assembly
Henry Smith (Wisconsin politician) (1838–1916), United States Representative from Wisconsin
Henry Augustus Middleton Smith (1853–1924), United States federal judge
Henry C. Smith (politician) (1856–1911), United States Representative from Michigan
Henry C. Smith (judge) (1862–1932), Justice of the Montana Supreme Court
Henry P. Smith III (1911–1995), United States Representative from New York

United Kingdom
Henry Smith (regicide) (1620–1668), English politician and jurist
Sir Henry Smith (Royal Navy officer) (1803–1887), naval officer 
Sir Henry Babington Smith (1863–1923), British civil servant
Sir Henry Moncrieff Smith (1873–1951), British administrator in India
Sir Henry Abel Smith (1900–1993), British Army officer and Governor of Queensland
Henry Wilson Smith (1904–1978), British civil servant
Henry Smith (British politician) (born 1969), Member of Parliament for Crawley
Henry Smith, 5th Viscount Hambleden (born 1955), British peer

Other countries
Henry Gilbert Smith (1802–1886), Australian politician
Henry Smith (Canadian politician) (1812–1868), Canadian lawyer and politician
Henry Dolphus Smith (1819–1889), Canadian politician
Henry Teesdale Smith (1858–1921), Australian businessman and politician
Henry L. Smith (1898–?), Garda Síochána (Irish police force)

Religion
Henry Smith (preacher) (c. 1560–c. 1591), English Puritan preacher
Henry Boynton Smith (1815–1877), American theologian
Henry Weston Smith (1827–1876), American preacher
Henry Preserved Smith (1847–1927), American Biblical scholar
Henry Goodwin Smith (1860–1940), American theologian
C. Henry Smith (1875–1948), Mennonite historian

Science and academia
Henry Lilley Smith (1787/89–1859), English surgeon
Henry John Stephen Smith (1826–1883), Irish mathematician
Henry A. Smith (1830–1915), American physician and poet
Henry George Smith (1852–1924), Australian chemist
Henry Louis Smith (1859–1951), president of Davidson College
Henry Nash Smith (1906–1986), American professor, founder of American Studies
Henry Smith (Egyptologist) (born 1928), British Egyptologist and academic

Sports
Henry Smith (discus thrower) (1955–2020), Samoan Olympic athlete
Henry Smith (long jumper) (born 1996), Australian long jumper
Henry Smith (Australian footballer) (1882–1957), Australian rules footballer
Henry Tyrell-Smith (1907–1982), Irish motorcyclist
Henry Smith (goalkeeper) (born 1956), Scottish football goalkeeper
Henry Smith (American football) (born 1983), American football player
Henry Smith (baseball), Negro leagues baseball player

Other people
Henry Walton Smith (1738–1792), English businessman, founder of W H Smith
Henry Smith (attorney) (1774–?), English lawyer and amateur artist
Henry More Smith (fl. 1814), Canadian escape artist, confidence man
Henry Smith (Royal Navy officer) (1803–1887), British naval officer
Henry Smith (VC) (1825–1862), English winner of the Victoria Cross during the Indian Mutiny
Henry Pember Smith (1854–1907), American painter
Henry Clay Smith (1874–1945), American architect
Henry Justin Smith (1875–1936), American newspaper editor
Henry Smith (lynching victim) (1876–1893), American black man killed by a mob in Paris, Texas
Henry Holmes Smith (1909–1986), American photographer
Henry Smith (police officer) (1836-1921), British police officer

Other uses
SS Henry B. Smith, a steel-hulled, propeller-driven lake freighter built in 1906

See also
Harry Smith (disambiguation)
Hal Smith (disambiguation)
Henry Smyth (disambiguation)

Smith, Henry